This glossary of skiing and snowboarding terms is a list of definitions of terms and jargon used in skiing, snowboarding, and related winter sports.

A

B

C

D

E

F

G

H

I

J

K

L

M

N

O

P

R

S

T

U

V

W

X

Y

See also
Outline of skiing
Winter sports

References

External links
Glossary of Ski Terms by Skis.com

Skiing and snowboarding
Skiing
Skiing-related lists
Snowboarding
Wikipedia glossaries using description lists